Radway is a village and civil parish in Warwickshire, England

Radway may also refer to:

Radway, Alberta, a hamlet in Alberta, Canada

People with the surname
Janice Radway (born 1949), American literary critic and writer
Raymond Radway (born 1987), American football player